Nordwall is a surname. Notable people with the surname include: 

Bengt Nordwall (born 1941), Swedish swimmer
Lars Nordwall (1928–2004), Swedish cyclist
Yngve Nordwall (1908–1994), Swedish film actor and director

Swedish-language surnames